The following is a list of films produced and/or released by STX Entertainment. It is one of the mini-major studios in the entertainment media as of today. The studio's first film released in 2015 was The Gift, written, co-produced and directed by Joel Edgerton and starring Jason Bateman and Rebecca Hall.

Released

2010s

2020s

Upcoming films

Undated films

See also
 :Category:Lists of films by studio

References 

 
Lists of films by studio
American films by studio